Claude Piquemal (born 13 March 1939 in Siguer, Ariège) was a French athlete who mainly competed in the 100 metres.

He competed for France in the 4 x 100 metre relay at the 1964 Summer Olympics held in Tokyo, Japan, where he won the bronze medal with his teammates Paul Genevay, Bernard Laidebeur and Jocelyn Delecour.

Piquemal and Delecour combined again four years later in Mexico City, this time with Gérard Fenouil and Roger Bambuck where they won the bronze medal in the same event.

References

External links
 
 
 

1939 births
Living people
French male sprinters
Olympic bronze medalists for France
Olympic athletes of France
Olympic bronze medalists in athletics (track and field)
Athletes (track and field) at the 1960 Summer Olympics
Athletes (track and field) at the 1964 Summer Olympics
Athletes (track and field) at the 1968 Summer Olympics
Medalists at the 1964 Summer Olympics
Medalists at the 1968 Summer Olympics
Mediterranean Games gold medalists for France
Mediterranean Games medalists in athletics
Athletes (track and field) at the 1963 Mediterranean Games
European Athletics Championships medalists
20th-century French people
21st-century French people